Belmont – Redwood Shores School District (BRSSD) is a K8 school district in California that serves the Belmont and Redwood Shores areas.

The district's schools and their principals include:

Central Elementary School  Charles Donovan
Cipriani Elementary School  Gwendolyn DeWees
Fox Elementary School  Taliah Carter
Redwood Shores Elementary School  Karrie Amsler
Sandpiper School  Gloria Higgins
Nesbit Elementary School  Ryan Hansen-Vera
Ralston Middle School  Sabrina Adler

References

External links
 District website
 Central website
 Cipriani website
 Fox website
 Redwood Shores website
 Sandpiper website
 Nesbit website
 Ralston website

School districts in San Mateo County, California